U.S.A. Confidential is a 1952 book written by Jack Lait and Lee Mortimer (Crown Publishers). Its theme is crime and corruption. The book is remarkable for early mentions of many who would become infamous, among them Benny Binion and Jimmy Fratianno.

1952 non-fiction books
Works about organized crime in the United States